Siyabonga Nene (born 7 April 1986), known professionally as Big Zulu, is a South African rapper and songwriter. He rose to spotlight after releasing the single "Donsa Nkabi" in 2016.

He signed a record deal with Universal Music in 2015 and Zulu released his debut album, Ushun Wenkabi (2018) and  Ungqongqoshe Wongqongqoshe (2019).
 
Zulu's third studio album Ichwane Lenyoka (2021), spawned three chart-topping singles "Mali Eningi", "Inhlupheko" and "Umuzi eSandton". Its  lead single "Mali Eningi", was certified double platinum by the Recording Industry of South Africa (RiSA).

Zulu also appeared in the television shows Isibaya, One Mic (2017-2020), Uzalo (2020) and Isithembiso. His accolades include seven South African Hip Hop Awards, and one South African Music Award.

Early life  
Siyabonga Nene was born and raised in Bergville, KwaZulu-Natal. He grew up listening to Maskandi and Isichathamiya music, influenced by Ladysmith Black Mambazo, Phuzekemisi and Imithente.

Artistry

Influences 
He is influenced by Maskandi and Scathamiya. He used to live in the Vaal in a place called Palm Springs.

Career

Career beginnings 
Zulu spent several years as a taxi driver and quit in 2008 to pursue his career in music. In 2009, he started writing songs and performing and earned title "King of Rap" in the rap battle contest held by Back to the City. His debut single "Donsa Nkabi" was released in 2016.

2014–2019: Ushun Wenkabi, Ungqongqoshe Wongqongqoshe 
After a number of years as an independent artist, he signed a record deal with Universal Music Records in 2015 and released his debut album Ushun Wenkabi in July 2018, with singles including "Ang'mazi umama" and "Home".
 
His second studio album Ungqongqoshe Wongqongqoshe was released in 2019, featuring Ab Crazy, Mnqobi Yazo, FiFi Cooper, Kwesta, Caspper Nyovest, Musiholiq and Truhitz. The lead single "Ak'laleki" featuring Kwesta was released. In 2 August his second  single "Ama Million" featuring Cassper Nyovest & Musiholiq  was released and peaked No. 5 on the iTunes Chart. The song was certified platinum. In August 14, his third single "Vuma dlozi" featuring Mnqobi Yazo was released and certified platinum by the Recording industry of South Africa  (RiSA) with sales of 50 000 copies.
The album was certified gold by the Recording Industry of South Africa (RiSA) and earned a nomination at the South African Music Awards (SAMA26) for Best Hip Hop Album. In the same year, 2019, the album was nominated for Best Male Artist of the Year and Album of the Year at the South African Hip Hop Awards.
He established his own record label Nkabi Records.

2020–2022: Ichwane Lenyoka,  Nkabi Nation 

On November 20, 2020, his single "Mali Eningi" was released  featuring Intaba Yase Dubai & Ricky Rick as the album's lead single. The song debuted number 2 on Channel 0 Top 30 charts  and was certified double platinum. At the 27th annual South African Music Awards, "Mali Eningi" won  Best collaboration category. At the end of 2020 he was selected for the first time on MTV Base: SA's Hottest MCs, at the fifth place.

Towards the end of the January 2021, he announced the working on his third studio album.

On March 11, 2021, he released a single "Inhlupheko" featuring Mduduzi Ncube as the second single. The song peaked at number one on the South African iTunes charts and reach number 4 on Shazam charts.

On 3 July 2021, he announced a new single titled "Umuzi eSandton" featuring Lwah Ndlunkulu on Twitter. The song was released on 9 July 2021; It was  featured on his album Ichwane Lenyoka, which was released on 3 September 2021. The single "Umuzi eSandton" reached number one on Shazam charts.

On September 13, 2021, he performed on season 14 on  Idols South Africa. Zulu won seven awards includes; Album of the Year, Song of the Year ("Mali Eningi"), Best Music Video, Best Male and Ubuntu Activism Award, Best Collaboration, and Best Digital Sales  at the  2021 South African Hip Hop Awards. At the end of 2021 he was selected again on MTV Base: SA's Hottest MCs, climbing to the second place.

"iVolovolo" featuring Xowla was released on February 11, 2022. The song debuted number one in South Africa.

"Voicemail" by Big Zulu Mduduzi Ncube, Lwah Ndlunkulu, Siya Ntuli and Xowla was released as album's lead single on June 24, 2022. The song was certified Gold and reached number one in South Africa.

Zulu released "150 Bars (Ke hip hop Dawg)" on August 20, 2022.

Zulu announced albums release date and final track listing on Instagram, released on September 09, 2022.

"Dear My Love" featuring K.O, Xowla and Siya Ntuli is a single by Big Zulu released on November 25, 2022.

2023-present: Inkabi Zezwe, Upcoming album 
On March 17, 2022, Big Zulu and Sjava announced the working on their joint upcoming album Ukhamba as duo Inkabi Zezwe released date to be announced. "Umbayimbayi" is set to be released on March 24, 2023 as album's lead single.

Other ventures
In 2019, Zulu founded the record label Inkabi Records. Zulu has since signed Mduduzi Ncube, Lwah Ndlunkulu, Xowla and Siya Ntuli.

On September 21, 2021, Zulu started charity and  donated with laptops and printers to Obonjaneni Primary School.

As of August 2020, he partnered with Spitz as the ambassador of carvella.

Discography

Studio albums 
 Ushun Wenkabi (2018)
 Ungqongqoshe Wongqongqoshe (2019)
 Ichwane Lenyoka (2021)

Collaborative albums 
 Inkabi Nation (2022)

As lead artist

Awards and nominations

References 

1987 births
Living people
South African singer-songwriters
People from KwaZulu-Natal
21st-century South African male singers
People from Okhahlamba Local Municipality